The Essential Michael Jackson is a greatest hits compilation album by American singer Michael Jackson. It was released on July 19, 2005, by Sony Music's catalog division Legacy Recordings as part of The Essential series. The two-disc compilation features thirty-eight hit songs by Michael Jackson, from his days at Motown Records with The Jackson 5 in the late 1960s and early 1970s to his 2001 hit "You Rock My World".

On August 26, 2008, The Essential Michael Jackson 3.0 was released in the United States as a limited edition containing an additional disc of seven songs performed by Jackson. A re-titled release in the United Kingdom was planned on July 6, 2009, as The Hits, but was cancelled upon Jackson's death. As of 2021, the album was certified 5× platinum in the United States for over 2.5 million copies sold. Worldwide, the compilation has sold an estimated 6 million copies.

Impact of album after death
Following Jackson's death on June 25, the album sold 102,000 units in the US on the chart week ending July 1, 2009. The following week the album sold 125,000 units in the US on the chart week ending July 8, 2009 and was the fourth biggest-selling album of the week.

As of 2021, the album was certified 5× platinum in the United States for over 2.5 million copies sold. Worldwide, the compilation has sold an estimated 6 million copies.

Track listing

European & international version

American & Canadian version

American limited-edition 3.0 bonus disc

Japanese version

Qobuz.com Studio Masters (digital version; 24bit/96kHz) 

 All attempted recreation of single edits are restored to actual single versions on digital edition with the exception of !"Off the Wall", which is an further edit of U.K. 7" remix and "Will You Be There," which is a radio edit with newly added string intro. Both versions are exclusive to this release.
 "Enjoy Yourself," "Blame It on the Boogie," "Don't Stop 'Til You Get Enough," and "Black or White" are restored to their album length on the digital edition.
 The uncut version of "The Lady in My Life" was announced on Legacy Recordings' website to be released on 2008's 3.0 edition bonus disc, but eventually omitted for unknown reasons. However, this version is previously available on the 2002 compilation The Songs of Rod Temperton, which has become a much sought-after item among Jackson collectors upon release, despite the fact that the version on the compilation is an inferior tape transfer with heavy, irreparable distortion due to tape degradation.
 A U.K. exclusive edition of this compilation was renamed as The Hits (with the same font as the five-album box set The Collection) and given a colorized version of the cover in 2009.

Charts

Weekly charts

Year-end charts

Decade-end charts

Certifications and sales

See also
 List of number-one albums of 2009 (Australia)
 List of number-one albums of 2009 (Mexico)
 List of number-one albums from the 2000s (UK)
 List of number-one R&B albums of 2009 (UK)

References

External links

https://www.pinterest.co.uk/pin/509540145314151655/

2005 greatest hits albums
Michael Jackson compilation albums
Albums produced by Michael Jackson
Epic Records compilation albums
Legacy Recordings compilation albums
Sony BMG compilation albums